Glorious Heights is the debut studio album by Australian art pop singer-songwriter Montaigne. It was released in August 2016 and peaked at number 4 on the ARIA Charts.

At the ARIA Music Awards of 2016, the album was nominated for Best Female Artist and won the ARIA Award for Breakthrough Artist – Release.

At the J Awards of 2016, the album was nominated for Australian Album of the Year.

Reception

Dylan Marshall from The AU Review called Glorious Heights "a momentous beginning" and "one of the albums that you can sit down, listen to and genuinely just really enjoy the moment; whether for its music, vocals, lyrics, themes, or a sweet combination of them all."

Isadora Vadasz from The Music Insight stated that "Over 13 tracks, Montaigne takes her listeners on an epic journey of wild highs and sullen lows... The resulting sound beckons you into a dark circus tent full of temptations and pleasant surprises."

Jeff Jenkins from Stack Magazine said "[Montaigne]'s debut album is aptly titled, with the singer delivering thrilling electro pop infused with genuine soul. She's just as effective when she straightens up and simplifies things – check out the ballad 'Consolation Prize' and the pure pop of 'What You Mean to Me'. A star is born."

Banda Wilson from Music Feeds wrote: "Glorious Heights is a record that is built around Montaigne's inimitable voice. Pretty much everything else created with the goal of featuring her vocals in a variety of contexts, in an effort to show off her vocal skillset."

Track listing

Personnel
Montaigne – vocals
Tony Buchen – production, recording, mixing
Next Episode – design
Wes Talbott – art
Leon Zervos – mastering

Charts

Release history

References

2016 albums
ARIA Award-winning albums
Montaigne (musician) albums
Wonderlick Entertainment albums
Sony Music Australia albums